Meganeuridae is an extinct family of griffinfly in the order Meganisoptera. There are more than 20 genera and 50 described species in Meganeuridae.

Genera
These 21 genera belong to the family Meganeuridae:

 † Arctotypus Martynov, 1932
 † Bohemiatupus Prokop & Nel, 2010
 † Boltonites Handlirsch, 1919
 † Carpentertypus Zessin 1983
 † Curvitupus Nel, Fleck, Garrouste, Gand, Lapeyrie, Bybee & Prokop, 2009
 † Ephemerites Geinitz, 1865
 † Gallotupus Nel, Garrouste & Roques, 2008
 † Gilsonia Meunier, 1908
 † Meganeura Brongniart, 1885
 † Meganeurina Handlirsch, 1919
 † Meganeuropsis Carpenter, 1939
 † Meganeurula Handlirsch, 1906
 † Megatypus Tillyard 1925
 † Nannotupus Nel, Fleck, Garrouste, Gand, Lapeyrie, Bybee & Prokop, 2009
 † Oligotypus Carpenter 1931
 † Permotupus Nel, Fleck, Garrouste, Gand, Lapeyrie, Bybee & Prokop, 2009
 † Petrotypus Zalesskii, 1950
 † Piesbergtupus Zessin, 2006
 † Shenzhousia Zhang & Hong, 2006
 † Stephanotypus Zessin 1983
 † Tupus Sellards, 1906

References

Meganisoptera
Prehistoric insect families